Ḥnanishoʿ I, called Ḥnanishoʿ the Exegete, was patriarch of the Church of the East between 686 and 698. His name means 'mercy of Jesus'.  Hnanishoʿ offended the caliph ʿAbd al-Malik with a tactless remark about Islam, which gave his enemies the opportunity to dethrone him in 691. He spent the next two years of his reign either in prison or, after surviving a murder attempt, in hiding, while the throne of Seleucia-Ctesiphon was occupied by the anti-patriarch Yohannan Garba ('the Leper'). He was restored in 693, after Yohannan's disgrace and death. After his death he was rehabilitated by his successor Sliba-zkha.

Sources 
Brief accounts of Hnanishoʿ's patriarchate are given in the Ecclesiastical Chronicle of the Jacobite writer Bar Hebraeus (floruit 1280) and in the ecclesiastical histories of the Nestorian writers Mari (twelfth-century), ʿAmr (fourteenth-century) and Sliba (fourteenth-century).  A modern assessment of Hnanishoʿ's reign can be found in David Wilmshurst's The Martyred Church.

Hnanishoʿ's patriarchate 
Hnanishoʿ was a student under Gabriel Arya at the School of Seleucia-Ctesiphon.

The following account of Hnanishoʿ's patriarchate is given by Bar Hebraeus:

Hnanishoʿ, who succeeded Yohannan Bar Marta in the dignity of catholicus, was consecrated at Seleucia in the year 67 of the Arabs [AD 686/7].  The metropolitan Yohannan of Nisibis, known as Garba ['the Leper'], was offended with him for the following reason.  When ʿAbd al-Malik, son of Marwan, the king of the Arabs arrived in the land of Senʿar [Babylonia], Hnanishoʿ came to meet him and offered him the usual presents.  The king said, 'Tell me, catholicus, what do you think of the religion of the Arabs?'  The catholicus, who was always prone to give hasty answers, replied, 'It is a kingdom founded by the sword; and not, like the Christian faith and the old faith of Moses, a faith that is confirmed by divine miracles.'  The king was angry, and ordered his tongue to be cut out, but several people interceded for him, and he was allowed to go free.  All the same, the king commanded that he should not again be admitted into his presence.  This incident gave Yohannan Garba an opportunity of realising his ambition.  He bribed some officials to forge him a letter from the king to Bshir bar Malka, the governor of ʿAqula. Yohannan went to him, offering him gifts and handing him the king's letter.  Bshir then summoned Hnanishoʿ, stripped him, and handed his patriarchal robe and staff of office to Yohannan.  He then sent Yohannan to Seleucia, where the bishops were forced to consecrate him. Yohannan kept Hnanishoʿ locked up in a prison for a while, then packed him off with two of his disciples to one of the mountain monasteries.  They made him climb up to the top of the mountain, and then threw him down.  They thought he was dead, but some shepherds found him, saw that he was still breathing, took him back to their hut and looked after him.  Eventually he left them and took shelter in the monastery of Yonan in the region of Mosul.  Meanwhile Yohannan had borrowed large sums of gold in order to bribe the governor of ʿAqula, and when the time came for repayment was unable to meet his obligations.  He was thrown into prison, and died there.  Then Hnanishoʿ resumed his rule, and died after fulfilling his office for fourteen years.

Bar Hebraeus also mentioned that Hnanishoʿ was rehabilitated after his death by his successor Sliba-zkha:

He removed the name of Yohannan Garba from the diptychs, reconsecrated the bishops consecrated by Garba, and put back the name of Hnanishoʿ, who had been oppressed by calumny, alongside those of the rest of the catholici.

Literary achievement 
Hnanishoʿ was a noted author.  Besides composing homilies, sermons and epistles, he was the author of a life of his contemporary Sargis Dauda of Dauqarah near Kashkar.  He also wrote a treatise On the Twofold Use of the School, in which he argued that schools and universities should be places of moral and religious training as well as of instruction in letters, and a commentary on the Analytics of Aristotle. His letters are an essential source for understanding the functioning of justice in the East Syrian world at the end of the 7th century.

Hnanishoʿ provides some insight into early Christian attitudes towards Islam. Bar Hebraeus, writing the 13th century, recorded the tradition that Hnanishoʿ, when asked "what do you think of the religion of the Arabs?" responded, "It is a religion established by the sword and not a faith confirmed by miracles, as the Christian faith and the old Law of Moses."

Posthumous miracles 
In 1349, Hnanishoʿ's remains were exhumed by the Nestorians of Mosul. The patriarch had been buried in the monastery of Jonah, on the east bank of the Tigris opposite Mosul, and when the tomb was opened his body, lying in a coffin of planewood, was found to be in a miraculous state of preservation. The historian ʿAmr, who saw the body for himself, said that crowds came to view the dead patriarch, who seemed to be only sleeping.  The monastery was confiscated and turned into a place of Muslim pilgrimage shortly afterwards, and when Timur Leng visited it in 1393 it had undergone a remarkable transformation. Hnanishoʿ was no longer remembered and Timur was shown the tomb of the prophet Jonah himself. The 'tomb of Jonah' still exists, and visitors are still shown a heavy planewood coffin, reverently shrouded with a green cloth, in which the prophet supposedly lies buried. Some historians suspect that for the past six centuries the Muslim faithful have been paying their devotions to the petrified corpse of a Christian patriarch.

See also
 List of patriarchs of the Church of the East

Notes

References
 Abbeloos, J. B., and Lamy, T. J., Bar Hebraeus, Chronicon Ecclesiasticum (3 vols, Paris, 1877)
 Assemani, J. A., De Catholicis seu Patriarchis Chaldaeorum et Nestorianorum (Rome, 1775)

 Brooks, E. W., Eliae Metropolitae Nisibeni Opus Chronologicum (Rome, 1910)
 Hoyland, Robert G. Seeing Islam As Others Saw It: A Survey and Evaluation of Christian, Jewish and Zoroastrian Writings on Early Islam (Darwin Press, 1997).
 Gismondi, H., Maris, Amri, et Salibae: De Patriarchis Nestorianorum Commentaria I: Amri et Salibae Textus (Rome, 1896)
 Gismondi, H., Maris, Amri, et Salibae: De Patriarchis Nestorianorum Commentaria II: Maris textus arabicus et versio Latina (Rome, 1899)
 Wilmshurst, David, The Martyred Church: A History of the Church of the East (London, 2011).

External links 

7th-century bishops of the Church of the East
7th-century deaths
Patriarchs of the Church of the East
Year of birth unknown